Nripendra may refer to
Nripendra Nath Roy, Indian politician 
Nripendra Narayan, former ruler of Cooch Behar 
Nripendra Misra, Indian civil servant
Nripendra Narayan Government High School, in Bangladesh
Nripendra Narayan Memorial High School, in Cooch Behar, India

Indian masculine given names